Langford and Ulting railway station served the village of Langford, Essex.

It was originally named Langford but was renamed Langford and Ulting in 1923.

The line and station closed to passenger services in 1964 as part of the Beeching closures.

References

External links
 Langford and Ulting station on navigable 1945 O. S. map
 
 Webpage including 1957 photograph of the station.

Disused railway stations in Essex
Former Great Eastern Railway stations
Beeching closures in England
Railway stations in Great Britain opened in 1848
Railway stations in Great Britain closed in 1964